This is a list of number one singles on the Billboard Brasil Hot 100 chart in 2013. Note that Billboard publishes a monthly chart.

Chart history

See also
Billboard Brasil
List of number-one pop hits of 2012 (Brazil)
Crowley Broadcast Analysis

References

Brazil Hot 100
2013 Hot 100